Alexander Mieling (born 24 December 1975) better known by his stage name Alex M.O.R.P.H. , is a German DJ and trance producer.

Musical career
Mieling released his first single in 1996, titled "Paysages", on the label Seelenlandschaften. One of his first collaborations was done together with Ralf Merle, with whom he created the Badlands project. After 2000, some of his productions were released on a label called Clubbgroove Records until 2003. Starting 2007, he collaborated with Paul Van Dyk to release a track on Paul's album, which led him to sign to his label Vandit and release his first album, Purple Audio. He has released most of his non-remix work on the Vandit label, including a remixed version of Purple Audio, and has released at least 34 singles as of 2020, with about half of them being on the Vandit label. He has recorded more than 500 remixes throughout his career. For the first time, in 2009, he entered the top 100 DJs in DJ Mag, of which he earned the 99th position. In 2011, he released his first music video, called "An Angel's Love", on the Armada Music label, which was viewed 3.8 million times on YouTube, making it his most popular work as of 2020. After the release of the music video "Angel's Love", he released his second album in 2012, called Prime Mover, on the Armada Music label.

Mieling founded a radio show called HeavensGate along with Woody van Eyden. He broadcasts weekly, and it is broadcast on more than 200 radio stations in over 50 countries and reaches more than 10 million listeners. It mainly focuses on trance music and house.

Discography

Studio albums and Singles

Compilation albums

DJ Mixes

Remixes

References

External links 

 

Club DJs
German DJs
German trance musicians
Armada Music artists
1975 births
Living people
Electronic dance music DJs